Christos Kalousis (born 14 January 1998) is a Greek professional footballer who plays as a defender for Super League 2 club Apollon Larissa.

References 

1998 births
Living people
Greek footballers
Association football defenders
Football League (Greece) players
Gamma Ethniki players
Super League Greece 2 players
A.E. Sparta P.A.E. players
Apollon Larissa F.C. players
Footballers from Larissa